The Woods Mountains are found in southeastern California in the Mojave Desert, at the southwestern end of the Lanfair Valley just east of Hole-in-the-Wall. The mountains are located in the Mojave National Preserve north of Interstate 40 and the Clipper Valley in San Bernardino County. The mountain was named in 1971 by Stephen Castagneto due to fragments of shells found atop from birds dropping tortoises so as to break their shells and feed on the inner meat. There are at least two known protected overhangs that show fire scoring as evidence of habitation by pre-contact Chemehuevi Indians.

References

Lanfair Valley
Mountain ranges of Southern California
Mountain ranges of the Mojave Desert
Mountain ranges of San Bernardino County, California